The Campaign for Nationalism in Scotland was an internal grouping within the Scottish National Party (SNP) that formed in response to the efforts of the 79 Group within the party.  The 79 Group was another internal grouping within the SNP that was attempting to turn the party into an expressly socialist party.  The Campaign for Nationalism in Scotland formed itself to try to ensure that the SNP avoided traditional debates of left and right, arguing that the cause of Scottish independence transcended such arguments.  It had the support of prominent traditionalists inside the party such as Winnie Ewing who had been a Member of Parliament in the 1960s and was by this stage a Member of the European Parliament.

SNP leader Gordon Wilson was determined to end factionalism inside the SNP, and at the party conference of 1982 internal groupings were banned.  This was largely a reaction to the growth of the 79 Group who faded in significance after this decision was taken.  After the 79 Group fell apart the Campaign for Nationalism in Scotland did likewise (however, many of the members of the 79 group were readmitted, and indeed came to lead the party).

Scottish National Party
Political party factions in Scotland